Hedong Subdistrict is a subdistrict of eastern Acheng District, in the southeastern suburbs of Harbin, People's Republic of China. , it has eight residential communities under its administration.

See also
List of township-level divisions of Heilongjiang

References

Township-level divisions of Heilongjiang
Harbin